Freaky Deaky is a 2012 crime-comedy-thriller film based on Elmore Leonard's 1988 novel of the same name. Produced, directed and written by Charles Matthau, the film starring Billy Burke, Christian Slater, Crispin Glover and Michael Jai White involves a bomb squad detective investigating weird goings-on of two 1960s ex-hippies cum revolutionaries in 1974 Detroit.

The movie was released straight to video after debuting at the Tribeca Film Festival.

Plot
Chris Mankowski worked in the bomb squad, but when he transferred out, he got caught up in an elaborate plot by former hippies, who have turned bomb making into a business.

Cast
 Billy Burke as Chris Mankowski
 Christian Slater as Skip Gibbs
 Crispin Glover as Woody Ricks
 Michael Jai White as Donnell Lewis
 Bill Duke as Wendell Robinson
 Roger Bart as Jerry Baker
 Breanne Racano as Robin Abbott
 Sabina Gadecki as Greta Wyatt
 Andy Dick as Mark Ricks
 Gloria Hendry as Sgt. Maureen Downey
 Page Kennedy as Booker
 Leonard Robinson as Juicy Mouth

Production
The film received $2.8 million in tax incentives from the state of Michigan.

References

External links
 
 

2010s crime thriller films
American crime comedy films
American crime thriller films
Films set in 1974
Films based on works by Elmore Leonard
Films based on American novels
Fictional portrayals of the Detroit Police Department
Films set in Michigan
Films shot in Michigan
Films shot in Detroit
2010s crime comedy films
2012 comedy films
2012 films
2010s English-language films
Films directed by Charles Matthau
2010s American films